Kenge is the capital of Kwango Province in the Democratic Republic of the Congo. As of 2009 it had an estimated population of 41,612.

Transport 
The town is served by Kenge Airport.

References

External links
 Google Maps - Kenge

Populated places in Kwango